Red Ox Inn (Hanul Boul Roșu) is a historic monument and hotel in Arad, Romania. It was built in the first half of 19th century for the traders coming to the city fairs.

The basic facts:

the inn was built on the ox market, today Arena market
on the ground floor was the restaurant and on the first floor the hotel
in 1890 there was the first celebration of the First May on the area of today Romania.

References 

Article contains translated text from Hanul Boul Roșu on the Romanian Wikipedia retrieved on 19 April 2017.

External links 
Homepage

Hotels in Romania
Buildings and structures in Arad, Romania
Historic monuments in Arad County